Alice Raingo Hoschedé Monet (February 19, 1844 – May 19, 1911) was the wife of department store magnate and art collector Ernest Hoschedé and later of the Impressionist painter Claude Monet.

Early life
According to unsourced genealogical data reported by Michael Legrand, she was born Angélique Émilie Alice Raingo on February 19, 1844, in Paris to Denis Lucien Alphonse Raingo and his wife Jeanne Coralie Boulade.

Marriage to Ernest Hoschedé
After meeting her future daughter-in-law in 1863, Ernest Hoschedé's mother wrote of Alice:

Her children (by Ernest Hoschedé) were Blanche (who married Claude's son, Jean Monet), Germaine, Suzanne, Marthe, Jean-Pierre, and Jacques.

Life with the Monet family
In 1876, Ernest Hoschedé commissioned Monet to paint decorative panels for the Château de Rottembourg and several landscape paintings. According to the Nineteenth-century European Art: A Topical Dictionary, it may have been during this visit that Monet began a relationship with Alice and her youngest son, Jean-Pierre, may have been fathered by Monet. 

Ernest Hoschedé went bankrupt in 1877. Ernest, Alice, and their children moved into a house in Vétheuil with Monet, Monet's first wife Camille, and the Monets' two sons, Jean and Michel. Ernest spent increasing lengths of time in Paris. He then lived in Paris and worked at le Voltaire.

There are times when Ernest Hoschedé returns to visit his wife and children at the successive Monet households of Vetheuil, Poissy and Giverny. During those times Monet leaves the household. The separation from Alice, though, leaves Monet greatly distressed, experiencing nightmares, and generally unable to paint.

Before the Monet and Hoschedé families had moved to Poissy, Ernest Hoschedé had refused to pay his share of the upkeep for Alice and the children. In 1886 he showed up and demanded that his wife and children return with him to Paris, but Alice remained with Monet.

Relationship with Claude Monet

After Camille Monet's death in 1879, Monet and Alice (along with the children from the two respective families) continued living together at Poissy and later at Giverny. Still married to Ernest Hoschedé and living with Claude Monet, the Le Gaulois newspaper in Paris declared that she was Monet's "charming wife" in 1880.

Ernest Hoschedé died in 1891 and Alice agreed to marry Monet in 1892.

Alice died on 19 May 1911. Her disappearance deeply affected the  painter. On the night of her death, he wrote to his friend, Gustave Geffroy, a French art historian and novelist:  This letter is on display in one of the rooms of Fondation Monet in Giverny.

Paintings of Alice
Some of the paintings of Alice Hoschedé Monet are:
 Claude Monet, Breakfast under the Tent, Giverny, 1888
 John Singer Sargent, Mme Hoschedé and Her Son in Monet's Garden, Giverny
 John Singer Sargent, Claude Monet PaintingIn popular culture
Amanda Root portrayed Hoschedé in the 2006 BBC docudrama The Impressionists''.

See also
Claude Monet
The Monet's home in Giverny

Notes

References

1844 births
1911 deaths
People from Paris
Claude Monet
French artists' models